The .475 A&M Magnum is a rifle cartridge developed in the United States. At the time of its development it was considered the most powerful sporting rifle cartridge ever developed. However, as the .475 A&M Magnum was a wildcat cartridge, the .460 Weatherby Magnum continued to be the most powerful commercial sporting cartridge available.

Description
The cartridge and rifle were designed by the Atkinson & Marquart Rifle Co. of Prescott, Arizona, by necking up the then new .460 Weatherby Magnum to accept a  diameter bullet. Fred N. Barnes, the founder of Barnes Bullets for whom the first rifle chambered for this cartridge was made, supplied the bullets. According to anecdotes, Fred Barnes gathered a group of people to demonstrate the rifle. The rifle was fired at the base of a small tree which was uprooted while Fred Barnes who had been shooting from a crouched position on a gravel bed had slid a few feet and ended on his back due to the recoil.

Only a small number of rifles have been chambered for this cartridge. Brass is easily fireformed using .460 Weatherby Magnum brass. Dies are available from Custom Brass and Bullets.

See also
List of cartridges by caliber
List of rifle cartridges
12 mm caliber

References

Notes
Barnes, Frank C., ed. by John T. Amber. ".475 A&M Magnum", in Cartridges of the World, pp. 142–3. Northfield, IL: DBI Books, 1972. .

Pistol and rifle cartridges
Wildcat cartridges